Oegoconiites is an extinct moth genus in the family Autostichidae. It contains the species Oegoconiites borisjaki, which was described from Baltic amber.

References

Symmocinae